Castlehaven is a civil parish in County Cork, Ireland. It is located approximately 75 km south west of Cork City on the coast. The civil parish includes the town of Castletownshend and also contains the hamlets of Rineen and Tragumna. The area's Gaelic football club, Castlehaven GAA, has claimed several Munster Senior Club Football Championship titles.

History
The Irish name Gleann Bearcháin was historically anglicised as Glanbarighan, Glanbaraghan and Glanbarrahan. The Battle of Castlehaven was a naval battle fought in 1601 during the Nine Years' War.

Sport
Castlehaven GAA is a Gaelic football club based in Castlehaven which participates in Cork GAA competitions. It has won five Cork Senior Football Championships and three Munster Senior Club Football Championships.

References

Civil parishes of County Cork